Crushin' is the fourth studio album by the hip hop group the Fat Boys, released in 1987. It would be their breakout album, charting in the top 10 on both Billboard Pop and R&B album charts. A cover version of the Surfaris' hit "Wipe Out" with the Beach Boys singing back-up vocals made it to #12 on the Billboard  chart, and #10 on the corresponding R&B listing.

Track listing
"Crushin'" – 4:46	
"Protect Yourself/My Nuts" – 4:08	
"Rock Ruling" – 3:50	
"Making Noise" – 3:40	
"Boys Will Be Boys" – 4:39	
"Falling In Love" – 5:03	
"Fat Boys Dance" – 3:42	
"Wipeout" featuring The Beach Boys – 4:32	
"Between The Sheets" – 4:24	
"Hell, No!" – 4:19

Charts

Weekly charts

Year-end charts

Singles

References

External links
 The Fat Boys-Crushin at Discogs

1987 albums
The Fat Boys albums
Polydor Records albums